747 is the sixth studio album by American country music group Lady Antebellum. It was released on September 30, 2014, by Capitol Nashville. The production on the album was handled by Nathan Chapman, Eric Kinney, Dave Thomson, busbee and Lady Antebellum. The album was supported by three singles: "Bartender" which was released in May 2014 and reached number one on the US Country Airplay chart in early September 2014. The other two singles were "Freestyle" and "Long Stretch of Love".

747 received generally positive reviews from music critics, it was praised by critics for exploring a more diverse sound and affirming their pop crossover appeal. The album was also a moderate commercial success. It debuted at number two on both the US Billboard 200 and the US Top Country Albums, selling 74,000 copies in its first week. This became the band's first album to miss number one on either the Billboard 200 or Top Country Albums charts. The album also entered the top ten on all-genre album charts in Australia, Canada, and France.

Content
Group member Hillary Scott told Billboard that they chose to name the album after the track "747" because "The track itself has this pushing, driving spirit about it that sums up our attitude right now. We are pushing ourselves as a band and as songwriters…taking ourselves out of our comfort zone and not taking ourselves too seriously. There's an urgency and an energy to it that we've never released before." The group produced the album with Nathan Chapman making it their first album not to be co-produced with longtime collaborator Paul Worley.

A deluxe version of the album was also released, containing three bonus tracks. One of these tracks, "Falling for You," was originally released on the soundtrack to the 2014 romantic drama The Best of Me. "Slow Rollin'" was originally recorded by Canadian country artist Dallas Smith.

Promotion

Tour

The group announced their international fourth headlining tour, the Wheels Up Tour, in January 2015. Sponsored in part by Quicken Loans, the tour is scheduled to begin in Oslo, Norway on February 28, 2015 and end in Camden, New Jersey in the United States on September 19, 2015. Hunter Hayes and Sam Hunt are the opening acts for the North American shows, with Brandy Clark, Kip Moore, Lee Brice, Troy Cassar-Daley, Kristian Bush, and Maddie & Tae opening for various international stops.

Singles
"Bartender" was released as the album's lead single on May 19, 2014. The song reached number four on the Billboard Hot Country Songs and also topped the Country Airplay and Canada Country charts in the fall of 2014. In October 2014, a "pop mix" of the song was serviced to hot adult contemporary radio. It peaked at number 25 on the Adult Pop Songs chart, their first song to crossover to the adult contemporary format since "Just a Kiss" in 2011.

The album's second single, "Freestyle", was initially made available to digital retailers on September 28, 2014 as the first promotional single from the album and was subsequently sent to country radio on October 20, 2014 as the second official single. "Freestyle" peaked at number 24 on Hot Country Songs (their lowest peak on the chart in either of its formats) and at number 16 on Country Airplay (their second-lowest peak, behind 2012's "Wanted You More" at No. 20). It became the group's first single to not enter the Billboard Hot 100, though it did peak at number 1 on the Bubbling Under Hot 100 Singles extension chart; it also failed to enter the Canadian Hot 100, their first to do so since "Lookin' for a Good Time" in 2008.

"Long Stretch of Love" is the album's third official single, and second to be released to the UK. It was released in the UK on February 7, 2015 and then to country radio in the US on March 23, 2015.

Other songs
"Lie with Me" was released as a radio-only promotional single in the UK in January or February 2015, serving as the album's lead single in that market.

Critical reception

The album received generally positive reviews from contemporary music critics. At Metacritic, which assigns a normalized rating out of 100 to reviews from mainstream critics, the album received an average score of 66, based on 5 reviews, which indicates "generally favorable reviews". Stephen Thomas Erlewine of AllMusic rated the album three-and-a-half stars out of five, writing that the album's pop-leaning sound "showcases the trio at its best" and that 747 gives the impression that the band has embraced its crossover status. Jill Menze of Billboard also noted the band's confidence on the record and attributed it to the more upbeat feel of the material. "The group's move away from its comfort zone is a worthy venture," writes Menze. "Lady A has always demonstrated the potential to deliver a little something more [and on] 747, we finally get a glimpse of it." Billy Dukes of Taste of Country praised the band for mixing things up on 747 and deviating from the middle of the road vibe of prior releases: "Over their last few albums, Charles Kelley and company had fallen back to the middle... ’747′ provides depth, variety and most importantly, a vibe Lady Antebellum can call their own." Dukes also compared the sound on 747 favorably to the repertoire of Fleetwood Mac, noting "Golden" collaborator Stevie Nicks's influence.

Michael McCall of MSN Entertainment described the album as having "a cohesive, celebratory feel that brings out the best in [the group] members" and praised the band for pursuing a   sound that sets them apart from other country acts. Gregory Hicks of The Michigan Daily wrote a positive review applauding the band for consistently delivering enjoyable country pop, but suggested that their sonic transformation on 747 was not as ambitious or pronounced as it has been made out to be. "As a typical Lady A-formulaic manufactured record," Hicks explains, "it’s an attractive, emotionally grasping LP... But don’t expect the album to cop an attitude in its sound."

In a more critical review, reporter Mikael Wood of The Los Angeles Times felt the album was too heavy on "zippy pop-country arrangements" and that the trio's trademark harmonies suffered at the expense of tempo. Marc Hirsh of The Boston Globe found the album's sequencing to be ineffective, drawing particular attention to the way the album "seems to simply stop" due to a lack of finality in the closing track, "Just a Girl", and criticized the band for being formulaic in their approach.

Commercial performance
747 received early predictions that the album would debut in the top ten and sell around 70,000 units. The album debuted at number two on the US Billboard 200 chart, selling 74,000 copies in its first week.  This became Lady Antebellum's sixth US top-ten debut. The album also debuted at number two on the US Top Country Albums chart. As of September 2015, the album has sold 285,900 copies in the United States.

In Canada, the album debuted at number three on the Canadian Albums Chart, selling 8,000 copies in its first week. On November 4, 2014, the album was certified gold by Music Canada for sales of over 40,000 copies.

Track listing

Personnel

Lady Antebellum
Dave Haywood – background vocals, acoustic guitar, bouzouki, electric guitar, mandolin
Charles Kelley – lead vocals, background vocals, tambourine
Hillary Scott – lead vocals, background vocals

Design
Amy Fucci – design
Mary Hilliard Harrington – art direction
Daniel Miller – art direction
Nino Muñoz – photography 
Karen Naff – art direction 
Josh Newman – art direction, design

Musicians

Steve Bryant – bass guitar
Tom Bukovac – electric guitar
Sarah Buxton – background vocals
Nathan Chapman – acoustic guitar, banjo, electric guitar, keyboards, mandolin, programming
Stuart Duncan – fiddle
Steve Fishell – steel guitar
Shannon Forrest – drums, percussion
Josh Kear – programming 
Eric Kinney – keyboards, programming 
Tim Lauer – keyboards
Tom Lombardo – acoustic guitar, electric guitar
Rob McNelley – electric guitar
Michael Rhodes – bass guitar
Michael Rojas – Hammond B-3 organ, keyboards 
Michael Stuckey – programming 
Dave Thompson – banjo, bass guitar, electric guitar, keyboards, percussion, programming 

Production

Sam Flora and Corrine Parish - lyrics
Chuck Ainlay – engineering
Keith Armstrong – mixing assistant
Kyle Connors - Assistant Engineer
Sean R. Badum – engineering
Jason Campbell – production coordination
Nathan Chapman – engineering, production 
Ted Jensen – mastering 
Nick Kallstrom – engineering

Eric Kinney – engineering, production 
Lady Antebellum – production
Chris Lord-Alge – mixing
Ernesto Olivera – engineering
Dave Thompson – engineering, production 
Chris Wilkinson  – assistant engineering, engineering
Brian David Willis – engineering

Charts

Weekly charts

Year-end charts

Singles

Certifications

References

2014 albums 
Albums produced by Nathan Chapman (record producer)
Lady A albums
Capitol Records Nashville albums